The Office of the Spokesperson for the Secretary-General is a department of the United Nations that provides information to the news media regarding the activities of the U.N. as a whole.

Role 
The department is in charge of managing media relations on behalf of:

 The Secretary-General of the United Nations
 The Deputy Secretary-General of the United Nations
 Other senior U.N. officials

Officers 
 Stéphane Dujarric – Spokesperson for the Secretary-General
 Farhan Haq – Deputy Spokesperson
 Charlotte Larbuisson – Associate Spokesperson for the Secretary-General
 Eri Kaneko – Associate Spokesperson
 Mathias Gillmann – Associate Spokesperson
 Florencia Soto Nino – Associate Spokesperson

Controversy 
In 2012, the official United Nations Twitter account posted an erroneous tweet, implying that the U.N. Secretary-General supports a one-state solution to the Israeli–Palestinian conflict. The tweet was later found to have been written by spokesperson Nancy Groves, who attributed it to a "terrible typo".

According to Reuters, the U.N. spokesperson post is considered to be a "dream job", but it requires taking into account the concerns of the 192 nations and "competing for the Secretary-General's attention".

External links 
 Homepage

References 

United Nations Secretariat
United Nations mass media